The Green Party of Ontario (GPO) is a political party in Ontario, Canada. The party is led by Mike Schreiner. In 2018, Schreiner was elected as the party's first member of the Ontario Legislative Assembly. In the past, the party did see significant gains in the 2007 provincial election, earning 8% of the popular vote with some candidates placing second and third in their ridings. A milestone was reached in the 2018 provincial election, when Schreiner was elected to the Legislative Assembly of Ontario in the riding of Guelph.

Elections Ontario records that in the 1999 provincial election, the GPO fielded 58 candidates, and became the fourth largest party in the province. In 2003, the party fielded its first nearly full slate, 102 out of 103 candidates, and received 2.8% of the vote. In 2007, in what many consider the breakthrough election for the GPO, the party fielded a full slate of 107 candidates, receiving over 8.0% and nearly 355,000 votes. The GPO had gained the most in the 2007 election and was one of only two parties that gained a significant amount of support. The rise in its political fortunes coincided with the national rise in support for the Green Party of Canada during the same period.  Subsequently, the party's popularity declined in the 2011 and 2014 elections during tightly contested races between the Progressive Conservatives and ruling Liberals. In the 2018 election, the party received 4.6% of the vote.

History

Early years

The late 1960s is widely seen as the start of the global ecological movement, however it wasn't until the 1970s that this movement began to gain political and economic legitimacy, with advances such as the founding of the world's first green party (New Zealand's Values Party), and the entry of the West German Greens (Die Grünen) into that country's legislature. The tiny, short-lived Small Party, named after E. F. Schumacher's book Small Is Beautiful, formed in the Maritimes in the mid to late 1970s, and was the first party in the Western Hemisphere related to the green movement. This party was founded by Elizabeth May, now the leader of the Green Party of Canada.

By the early 1980s, the idea of organized Green politics began to gain in international popularity, and in 1983 the Green Party of Ontario was registered with Elections Ontario. Shortly after the GPO was registered it contested its first election, fielding nine candidates who collected a combined 5,300 votes or 0.14%. In the 1987 election the party again ran nine candidates who fared worse, collecting 3,400 votes or 0.09%. In 1990, to the surprise of many, the GPO captured a much higher result, with 40 candidates capturing 30,400 votes or 0.75%.

Frank de Jong years

It wasn't until 1993, however, that the party began to properly organize itself, electing Frank de Jong as its first official leader. The GPO and their newly selected leader ran in their first election as an organized party in the 1995 provincial election. However, even with a new leader and just three candidates less than 1990, the party lost more than half their support, falling to just 14,100 or 0.34%.

De Jong led the party through three election campaigns, gradually building party support from less than one percent in the early 1990s to just over 8% in the 2007 provincial election.

In the 1999 provincial election the party ran 57 candidates and collected 0.70% or 30,800 votes. With 17 more candidates the party fell 0.05% short of their 1990 result; however, this was a large increase compared to the previous election (1995). In addition, increased organization resulted in the addition of a Deputy Leader and a Shadow Cabinet. The first Deputy Leader of the Green Party of Ontario was Judy Greenwood-Speers. She served the party in this role from 1999 to 2002. Ms Greenwood-Speers was also the party's first Issue Advocate, continuously serving as the Advocate for Health and Long Term Care, and in the Senior's Secretariat from 1999 to today.

The 2003 provincial election was what many consider to be the first breakthrough for the Greens. Running 102 out of a possible 103 candidates the GPO was able to capture 126,700 votes, or 2.82%. The GPO placed ahead of the Ontario New Democratic Party (NDP) in two ridings, and took fourth place in 92 others. Just eight candidates fared worse than fourth place.

De Jong announced his resignation as leader on 16 May 2009, at the Green Party of Ontario Annual General Meeting.  A leadership and policy convention was held 13–15 November 2009 in London, Ontario.

Recent history

Throughout 2006 there was a move toward major constitutional changes in the party, led by Executive Council Member-at-Large (former GPO President) Ron Yurick. During the May Annual Policy Conference in Toronto, and the September 2006 AGM in Lion's Head, Ontario, sweeping changes were approved to the party's governance structures. It was described as "the culmination of hundreds of hours of work that evolved out of a directive passed at the 2004 (AGM) in Cambridge. Included in the changes were the formation of a much larger Provincial Executive, which included two gender paritied representatives from each of six regions, gender paritied Deputy Leaders, and the creation of multiple functionary roles (a quasi civil service) separated from the Provincial Executive.

At the Party's 2006 Annual General Meeting (AGM) the Party adopted further changes to the existing Constitution that, amongst other things, reduced the size of the Provincial Council and renamed it the Provincial Executive. One of the first acts of the new Provincial Executive was to strike a hiring committee to bring on a full-time campaign manager in response to mounting internal pressures to ensure the party was ready for the October 2007 provincial election.

In the run-up to the 2007 provincial election, the Greens' support climbed into the double-digits for the first time in party history. Although the party did not elect a member to the provincial legislature, they did increase their share of the popular vote to 8.1% (a gain of 5.3% from the 2003 election), placed second in one riding (Bruce—Grey—Owen Sound, with 33.1% compared to the PC incumbent winner's 46.7%), and took third place in a number of other ridings, ahead of candidates from previously elected parties.  Shane Jolley, the Green candidate for Bruce-Grey-Owen Sound, earned more votes than any Green candidate in Canadian history at that time.

The party had its 2007 AGM at an Easter Seals camp near Perth on 23 November to the 25. It was the largest AGM in GPO history at that time with over 120 delegates and over 400 proxy votes. The GPO adopted changes to the constitution, many involving the provincial executive. A few directives to the executive also discussed at the AGM included party bilingualism and fundraising. The party voted in the new executive including a new president Lawson Hunter, while former president Ron Yurick was voted in as Northern male rep. Over 70% of the voting membership had also voted to re-elect party leader Frank de Jong for another two years.

De Jong resigned as leader in 2009 and was replaced by Toronto entrepreneur Mike Schreiner who was the sole candidate in the party's leadership race. The Greens won no seats in the 2011 and 2014 provincial elections.

2018 & 2022 Elections 
In the 2018 provincial election, the party ran on a platform of investing in green jobs and clean energy, rolling out a universal basic income, shifting away from nuclear power, lowering payroll taxes for small businesses and implementing road tolls to fund transit infrastructure. The party ran a full slate of candidates including over 50% women for the first time. Mike Schreiner was excluded from the televised leaders debates, which led to an unsuccessful campaign by Fair Debates to encourage media to reverse the decisions. The GPO finally broke through on 7 June 2018, with leader Mike Schreiner winning a seat in Guelph and becoming the first Green MPP in Ontario history. He was sworn into the Ontario Legislature on 5 June 2018.

Schreiner was re-elected in the 2022 provincial election and was again the only Green candidate elected.

Policies
The Green Party of Ontario shares the values identified by the Global Greens. Although the party has generally been perceived as being left-wing, the party combines ecologically and socially reformist policies with strong respect for the free market and entrepreneurship.

Several key members have been recruits from the former centre-right Progressive Conservative Party of Canada, including Elio Di Iorio, who was a protégé of former Canadian Prime Minister Joe Clark, and Peter Elgie, son of former Ontario Progressive Conservative cabinet minister Robert Elgie.  The party's former Chief Financial Officer, David Scrymgeour, was the National Director of the former Progressive Conservative Party of Canada.

Under Frank de Jong, the GPO emphasized policies typical of both left- and right-wing parties. In the words of de Jong, the GPO tends to favour policies that are "socially progressive, fiscally conservative, and environmentally aware". As such, policies in areas such as education, health, environmental protection and social equity are notably progressive, while policies on income & property taxation, market regulation, and industrial subsidization are more conservative in nature. Contrary to most other parties, the Greens prefer a model of decentralization, where administration of local programs/services (for example, local schools, hospitals, housing, and transport) are left to local government which is more responsive to local needs/realities, but where costs are not simply downloaded without the ability to raise local revenue (such as with previous Progressive Conservative governments). The party emphasizes interconnectivity between various policy areas (for example, health and the environment, or the environment and the economy).

Taxation

GPO policy proposes a concept known as green tax shifting, which it classifies under the broad context of ecological fiscal reform. In general, the party proposes gradual but significant reductions in all income and corporate taxes (or taxes on so-called "earned income"), funded by the introduction of new resource-based taxes applied at the point of entry into the economy (for example, carbon taxes). The Green Party also proposes introduction of a system of land value taxation, which would replace the current value assessment-based property tax system and would be meant to discourage urban sprawl and increase land use efficiency. Central to the GPO's tax policies is the concept of revenue neutrality, in which any new taxes (i.e., those on resources and consumption) are complemented by a reduction in other forms of taxation (generally income and corporate taxes).

This mixture of libertarian and free-market income tax policies with a shift towards consumption/resource taxation is one of the clear differences between the Ontario Greens and the three main provincial parties. For example, while the NDP and to a lesser extent the Liberals aim to create social equity through progressive taxation of already-earned income, and the Conservatives do not necessarily view social equity to be the role of government, the Greens prefer allowing individuals/businesses to contribute by paying more for what they use (resources, energy) and the pollution/side-effects that they create.

The GPO claims that this system is more fair and more economically desirable, because it only punishes individuals and businesses who operate without regard for society and the environment, while accentuating the ability of truly efficient and responsible businesses to prosper without hindrance. Critics of these policies, however, oppose these taxation methods because they view them as examples of regressive taxation due to the fact that they would have a bigger economic impact that would be felt in the everyday lives of lower-income groups.

Greens have historically supported tax relief for small businesses, generally funded by modest increases to the corporate tax rate. They have also proposed road pricing (including tolls, parking levies and land-value taxes near subways) to pay for public transit.

The party favours a revenue neutral carbon fee-and-dividend approach to pollution pricing. Under the scheme, emitters would be charged at the source of pollution and all revenues collected would be returned to citizens in the form of dividend cheques.

Health

The Greens base their health policies on prevention, and claim to consider health in areas such as organic agriculture, active transportation, urban planning, and education. In particular, party policy closely links the areas of disease prevention and environmental health, with policies such a ban on cosmetic pesticides, a Cancer Prevention Act, a Lyme Disease Strategy, and doubling funding for the Ministry of Health Promotion. Policies on health care include expanding the Community Care Access Centre (CCAC) system, increasing support for multidisciplinary clinics (those with doctors, nurses, nurse practitioners, psychologists, dieticians, and other health care professionals), and increasing support for midwifery, along with a number of administrative reforms. GPO policy emphasizes a reduction in health care costs through avoidance of illness and expansion of alternative access models (such as CCACs), rather than simply closing facilities or increasing expenditures.

In its 2007 platform, the Green Party of Ontario advocated a full phasing-out of the Ontario Health Premium tax.

In its 2018 platform, the party proposed a major increase in funding for mental health services, a first step towards transitioning to full coverage under OHIP+.

Social programs 
The Green Party of Ontario believes in modernizing the social safety net to account for present-day challenges. It has been an advocate for a universal Basic Income for all Ontarians, in order to provide economic security while at the same time cutting red tape and bureaucracy. In 2017, Ontario introduced a Basic Income pilot program, which the Greens wanted to see rolled out across the province.

Education

During the 2007 provincial election, education, and specifically the funding of religious schools, was a central issue. GPO policy calls for an end to the publicly funded Catholic school system, a merger that it claimed would save millions of dollars in duplicate administrative costs. Other items include giving local school boards a say in funding allocation, ending standardized testing of students, and encouraging programmes such as physical education, environmental education, and a mandatory course in world religions. At the post-secondary level, the GPO proposes a tuition cap of $3 000 per year for university studies and $700 per year for college and increased funding for apprenticeship programmes.

Electoral reform
The GPO is a strong supporter of electoral reform. It is in favour of the Mixed Member Proportional representation system recommended by the Citizens' Assembly on Electoral Reform in May 2007 and defeated in the Ontario referendum in October 2007. This system would make the number of seats attributed to the party in a "members-at-large" section of the legislature approximately equal to the percentage of the vote won by the party in separate party vote.

Party leaders

Elected Greens

• 2018: Mike Schreiner, elected in Guelph

Election results

See also 

 Green Party of Ontario candidates in Ontario provincial elections
 List of Green party leaders in Canada
 List of Green Party of Ontario candidates
 List of Green politicians who have held office in Canada
 List of Ontario general elections
 List of political parties in Ontario
 Ontario Greens Shadow Cabinet
 Politics of Ontario

References

External links 

 
 A History of the Green Party in Ontario, by Frank de Jong

 
1983 establishments in Ontario
Environmental organizations based in Ontario
Organizations based in Toronto
Political parties established in 1983
Political parties supporting universal basic income
Provincial political parties in Ontario